is a Japanese light novel series written by Hisaya Amagishi. The series originated on the Shōsetsuka ni Narō website in April 2018, before being published in print with illustrations by Kei by Media Factory beginning in October 2018. Eight volumes have been released. Two manga adaptations, illustrated by Kamada and Megumi Sumikawa, began serialization in the Comp Ace magazine and Mag Comi website in April 2019. The first series completed serialization in February 2020 with its chapters collected into two volumes, whereas the second series, titled Magic Artisan Dahlia Wilts No More, has been published in five volumes.

Media

Light novel
Written by Hisaya Amagishi, the series began publication on the novel posting website Shōsetsuka ni Narō on April 1, 2018. The series was later acquired by Media Factory, who began publishing the series in print with illustrations by Kei on October 25, 2018. As of June 2022, eight volumes have been released.

In July 2021, J-Novel Club announced that they licensed the series for English publication.

Volume list

Manga
A manga adaptation, illustrated by Kamada, began serialization in Kadokawa Shoten's Comp Ace magazine on April 26, 2019. It completed serialization on February 26, 2020. The series' individual chapters were collected into two tankōbon volumes.

Another manga adaptation, titled Magic Artisan Dahlia Wilts No More and illustrated by Megumi Sumikawa, began serialization on Mag Garden's Mag Comi website on April 25, 2019. As of September 2022, the series' individual chapters have been collected into five tankōbon volumes. In September 2021, Seven Seas Entertainment announced that they licensed the series for English publication.

Volume list

First series

Second series

Reception
Sean Gaffney from A Case Suitable for Treatment praised the characters and romance, though he felt the story was a bit generic. Rebecca Silverman from Anime News Network praised the illustrations and main characters, though she criticized a "lack of authorial focus".

In the Kono Light Novel ga Sugoi! guidebook's tankōbon and novel category, the series ranked ninth in 2021 and 2022 and second in 2023.

The series has 1.2 million copies in circulation.

References

External links
  
  
  
 

2018 Japanese novels
Anime and manga based on light novels
Isekai anime and manga
Isekai novels and light novels
J-Novel Club books
Japanese webcomics
Kadokawa Shoten manga
Light novels
Light novels first published online
Mag Garden manga
Romance anime and manga
Seinen manga
Seven Seas Entertainment titles
Shōnen manga
Shōsetsuka ni Narō
Webcomics in print